{{Infobox settlement
| name                            = Santa Fé do Sul
| settlement_type                 = Municipality
| official_name                   = The Municipality ofSanta Fé do Sul
| nickname                        = 
| motto                           = 
| image_skyline                   = 
| imagesize                       = 
| image_caption                   = 
| image_flag                      = Bandeira de Santa Fé do Sul-SP, Brasil.jpg
| image_seal                      = Brasao santafe.jpg
| image_map                       = SaoPaulo Municip SantaFedoSul.svg
| mapsize                         = 250px
| map_caption                     = Location of Santa Fé do Sul
| pushpin_map                     = Brazil
| subdivision_type                = Country
| subdivision_type1               = Region
| subdivision_type2               = State
| subdivision_type3               = Mesoregion
| subdivision_name                = 
| subdivision_name1               = Southeast
| subdivision_name2               = 
| subdivision_name3               = São José do Rio Preto
| leader_title                    = Mayor
| leader_name                     = Evandro Mura (PSL)
| established_title               = 
| established_date                = 2009
| area_total_km2                  = 208.2
| area_total_sq_mi                = 
| area_urban_km2                  = 
| area_urban_sq_mi                = 
| population_as_of                = 2020 
| population_note                 = 
| population_total                = 32,563
| population_density_km2          = 140.43
| population_density_sq_mi        = 
| population_urban                = 28088
| timezone                        = BRT
| utc_offset                      = −3
| timezone_DST                    = 
| utc_offset_DST                  = 
| coordinates                     = 
| elevation_m                     = 370
| elevation_ft                    = 
| area_code                       = +55 17
| postal_code_type                = Postal Code
| postal_code                     = 15775-000
| website                         = Prefecture of Santa Fé do Sul, São Paulo
| blank_name                      = HDI'' (UNDP/2000)
| blank_info                      = 0.809 – high
| footnotes                       = 
}}Santa Fé do Sul''' is a municipality in the state of São Paulo, Brazil. The population is of 32,563 (IBGE/2020) and the area is 208.2 km2.

It is located on the northwest of the state, 642 km from the city of São Paulo, and is a tourist resort on the Paraná River. Santa Fé do Sul belongs to the Mesoregion of São José do Rio Preto

Economy

The Tertiary sector is the economic basis of Santa Fé. Commerce, services and public administration corresponds to 63.5% of the city GDP. Industry is relevant, with 34.8% of the GDP, and the Primary sector corresponds to 1.7%.

References

Municipalities in São Paulo (state)